The Whirlpool Galaxy, also known as Messier 51a, M51a, and NGC 5194, is an interacting grand-design spiral galaxy with a Seyfert 2 active galactic nucleus. It lies in the constellation Canes Venatici, and was the first galaxy to be classified as a spiral galaxy. Its distance is 31 million light-years from Earth.

The galaxy and its companion, NGC 5195, are easily observed by amateur astronomers, and the two galaxies may be seen with binoculars. The Whirlpool Galaxy has been extensively observed by professional astronomers, and its pair with NGC 5195 who study it to understand galaxy structure (particularly structure associated with the spiral arms) and galaxy interactions. Its pair with NGC 5194 is among the most famous interacting systems, and thus is a favorite subject of galaxy interaction models.

Discovery

What later became known as the Whirlpool Galaxy was discovered on October 13, 1773, by Charles Messier while hunting for objects that could confuse comet hunters, and was designated in Messier's catalogue as M51. Its companion galaxy, NGC 5195, was discovered in 1781 by Pierre Méchain, although it was not known whether it was interacting or merely another galaxy passing at a distance. In 1845, William Parsons, 3rd Earl of Rosse, employing a  reflecting telescope at Birr Castle, Ireland, found that the Whirlpool possessed a spiral structure, the first "nebula" to be known to have one. These "spiral nebulae" were not recognized as galaxies until Edwin Hubble was able to observe Cepheid variables in some of these spiral nebulae, which provided evidence that they were so far away that they must be entirely separate galaxies.

The advent of radio astronomy and subsequent radio images of M51 unequivocally demonstrated that the Whirlpool and its companion galaxy are indeed interacting. Sometimes the designation M51 is used to refer to the pair of galaxies, in which case the individual galaxies may be referred to as M51a (NGC 5194) and M51b (NGC 5195).

Visual appearance

Deep in the constellation Canes Venatici, M51 is often found by finding the easternmost star of the Big Dipper, Eta Ursae Majoris, and going 3.5° southwest. Its declination is, rounded, +47°, making it circumpolar (never setting) for observers above the 43rd parallel north; it reaches a high altitude throughout this hemisphere making it an accessible object from the early hours in November through to the end of May, after which observation is more coincidental in modest latitudes with the risen sun (due to the Sun approaching to and receding from its right ascension, specifically figuring in Gemini, just to the north).

M51 is visible through binoculars under dark sky conditions, and it can be resolved in detail with modern amateur telescopes. When seen through a 100 mm telescope the basic outlines of M51 (limited to 5×6') and its companion are visible. Under dark skies, and with a moderate eyepiece through a 150 mm telescope, M51's intrinsic spiral structure can be detected. With larger (>300 mm) instruments under dark sky conditions, the various spiral bands are apparent with HII regions visible, and M51 can be seen to be attached to M51B.

As is usual for galaxies, the true extent of its structure can only be gathered from inspecting photographs; long exposures reveal a large nebula extending beyond the visible circular appearance. In 1984, thanks to the high-speed detector—the so-called image-photon-counting system (IPCS)—developed jointly by the CNRS Laboratoire d'Astronomie Spatiald (L.A.S.-CNRS) and the Observatoire de Haute Provence (O.H.P.) along with the particularly nice seeing offered by the Canada-France-Hawaii-Telescope (C.F.H.T.) 3.60m Cassegrain focus at Mauna Kea summit in Hawaii, Hua et al. detected the double component of the very nucleus of the Whirlpool galaxy.

In January 2005 the Hubble Heritage Project constructed a 11,477 × 7,965-pixel composite image (shown in the infobox above) of M51 using Hubble's ACS instrument. The image highlights the galaxy's spiral arms, and shows detail into some of the structures inside the arms.

Properties
The Whirlpool Galaxy lies at a distance of about 31 million light-years from Earth. Overall the galaxy is about 88% the size of the Milky Way. Its mass is estimated to be 160 billion solar masses, or around 10.3% of the mass of Milky Way Galaxy.

A black hole, once thought to be surrounded by a ring of dust, but now believed to be partially occluded by dust instead, exists at the heart of the spiral. A pair of ionization cones extend from the active galactic nucleus.

Spiral structure
The Whirlpool Galaxy has two, very prominent spiral arms that wind clockwise. One arm deviates from a constant angle significantly. 
The pronounced spiral structure of the Whirlpool Galaxy is believed to be the result of the close interaction between it and its companion galaxy NGC 5195, which may have passed through the main disk of M51 about 500 to 600 million years ago. In this proposed scenario, NGC 5195 came from behind M51 through the disk towards the observer and made another disk crossing as recently as 50 to 100 million years ago until it is where we observe it to be now, slightly behind M51.
In 2015, a study discovered two new tidal features caused by the interaction between the Whirlpool Galaxy and NGC 5195, the "Northeast plume" and the "South plume". The study remarks that a simulation that takes into account only one passage of NGC 5195 into the Whirpool Galaxy will fail to produce an analogue to the Northeast tail. In contrast, the multiple-passage simulations made by Salo and Laurikainen et.al reproduce the northeast plume.

Star formation
The central region of M51 appears to be undergoing a period of enhanced star formation.
The present efficiency of star formation, defined as the ratio of mass of new stars to the mass of star-forming gas, is only ~1%, quite comparable to the global value for the Milky Way and other galaxies. It is estimated that the current high rate of star formation can last no more than another 100 million years or so.

Transient events
Three supernovae have been observed in the Whirlpool Galaxy:

In 1994, SN 1994I was observed in the Whirlpool Galaxy. It was classified as type Ic, indicating that its progenitor star was very massive and had already shed much of its mass, and its brightness peaked at apparent magnitude 12.91.

In June 2005 the type II supernova SN 2005cs was observed in the Whirlpool Galaxy, peaking at apparent magnitude 14.

On 31 May 2011 a type II supernova was detected in the Whirlpool Galaxy, peaking at magnitude 12.1. This supernova, designated SN 2011dh, showed a spectrum much bluer than average, with P Cygni profiles, which indicate rapidly expanding material, in its hydrogen-Balmer lines. The progenitor was probably a yellow supergiant and not a red or blue supergiant, which are thought to be the most common supernova progenitors.

On 22 January 2019, a supernova impostor, designated AT2019abn, was discovered in Messier 51. The transient was later identified as a luminous red nova. The progenitor star was detected in archival Spitzer Space Telescope infrared images.

Planet candidate
In September 2020, the detection by the Chandra X-ray Observatory of a candidate exoplanet, named M51-ULS-1b, orbiting the high-mass X-ray binary M51-ULS-1 in this galaxy was announced. If confirmed, it would be the first known instance of an extragalactic planet, a planet outside the Milky Way Galaxy. The planet candidate was detected by eclipses of the X-ray source (XRS), which consists of a stellar remnant (either a neutron star or a black hole) and a massive star, likely a B-type supergiant. The planet would be slightly smaller than Saturn and orbit at a distance of some tens of astronomical units.

Companion

NGC 5195 (also known as Messier 51b or M51b) is a dwarf galaxy that is interacting with the Whirlpool Galaxy (also known as M51a or NGC 5194). Both galaxies are located approximately 31 million light-years away in the constellation Canes Venatici. Together, the two galaxies are one of the most widely studied interacting galaxy pairs.

Galaxy group information

The Whirlpool Galaxy is the brightest galaxy in the M51 Group, a small group of galaxies that also includes M63 (the Sunflower Galaxy), NGC 5023, and NGC 5229. This small group may actually be a subclump at the southeast end of a large, elongated group that includes the M101 Group and the NGC 5866 Group, although most group identification methods and catalogs identify the three groups as separate entities.

Gallery

See also
 List of Messier objects
 List of galaxies
 Messier object
 Messier 101 – another grand-design spiral galaxy
 New General Catalogue
 NGC 5195 – the companion galaxy to NGC 5194

References and footnotes

External links 

 SEDS: Spiral Galaxy M51
 
 Whirlpool Galaxy at ESA/Hubble
 The Whirlpool Galaxy (Messier 51(a)/NGC 5194)
 M51 The Whirlpool Galaxy
 The Whirlpool Galaxy at Constellation Guide
 The Whirlpool Galaxy in the Staracle Messier catalog

Unbarred spiral galaxies
Interacting galaxies
Peculiar galaxies
M51 Group
Canes Venatici
Messier objects
NGC objects
08493
47404
085
Seyfert galaxies
17731013
Discoveries by Charles Messier